The Athichudi is a collection of single-line quotations written by Avvaiyar and organized in alphabetical order. There are 109 of these sacred lines which include insightful quotes expressed in simple words. It aims to inculcate good habits, discipline and doing good deeds.

Description 

English translation of உயிர் வருக்கம்

English translation of உயிர்மெய் வருக்கம்

English translation of ககர வருக்கம்

English translation of சகர வருக்கம்

English translation of தகர வருக்கம்

English translation of நகர வருக்கம்

English translation of பகர வருக்கம்

English translation of மகர வருக்கம்

English translation of வகர வருக்கம்

References

External links
 aramseyavirumbu.com - ஒளவையாரின் ஆத்திச்சூடி, அதற்கான எளிய விளக்கவுரை மற்றும் ஆங்கில மொழிப்பெயர்ப்பு, அதன்மீதான பயனுள்ள விவாதங்கள் மற்றும் வாசகர் கருத்துக்கள் – அனைத்தையும் ஒருங்கே பார்க்க, ரசிக்க, பங்களிக்க, பதிலளிக்க…
 ஆத்திச்சூடி விளக்கத்துடன் (With Meaning)
 All Athichudi
 ஔவையார் பாடல்கள் (Avaiyaar Paadalgal)
 ஆத்திச்சூடி

Literature, Tamil
Tamil-language literature
Tamil Hindu literature